Gojira (ゴジラ) is the original Japanese name for Godzilla, a giant monster at the center of a media franchise.
It may also refer to:

Films
Godzilla franchise, known as ゴジラ (Gojira) in Japan
Godzilla (1954 film), released as ゴジラ (Gojira) in Japan
The Return of Godzilla, released as ゴジラ (Gojira) in Japan
Godzilla (1998 film), an American film released as ゴジラ (Gojira) in Japan
Zilla (Godzilla) (ジラ Jira), the title character of 1997's Godzilla technically named "Gojira"
Godzilla (2014 film), an American film released as ゴジラ (Gojira) in Japan
Shin Godzilla, released as シン・ゴジラ (Shin Gojira), a 2016 reboot

Derivative usages
Gojira (band), a French heavy metal band
101781 Gojira, an asteroid
Gojirasaurus, the "Godzilla lizard", a Triassic-period dinosaur
Gojiro, a 1991 novel by Mark Jacobson
MV Gojira, the original name of the MV Brigitte Bardot
A nickname given to Japanese baseball player Hideki Matsui
Jira (software), a software product developed by Atlassian

See also
Godzilla (disambiguation)